Barale is an Italian surname. Notable people with the surname include:

Enry Juan Barale (born 1941), Argentine footballer
Germano Barale (born 1936), Italian racing cyclist
Oreste Barale (1904–1982), Italian footballer and manager
Paola Barale (born 1967), Italian actress

Italian-language surnames